Campaign Button is a 4-track CD EP of songs by the Irish singer/songwriter Fionn Regan.

Track listing 
"Campaign Button" – 3:09
"Medicine Chest" – 3:26
"The Ballad of the Toad Eaters" – 3:05
"Ice Cap Lullaby" – 1:24

References

2005 EPs
Fionn Regan albums